The Lars Onsager Prize is a prize in theoretical statistical physics awarded annually by the American Physical Society. Prize recipients receive a medal, certificate, and $10,000.  It was established in 1993 by Drs. Russell and Marian Donnelly in memory of Lars Onsager.

Recipients

See also
 List of physics awards

Notes

Awards of the American Physical Society
Awards established in 1993